() is a Koine Greek adjective used in the Lord's Prayer verse "" ('Give us today our  bread'). Because the word is used nowhere else, its meaning is unclear.  It is traditionally translated as "daily", but most modern scholars reject that interpretation. The word is also referred to by the form .

Since it is a Koine Greek dis legomenon (a word that occurs only twice within a given context) found only in the New Testament passages Matthew 6:11 and Luke 11:3, its interpretation relies upon morphological analysis and context. The traditional and most common English translation is daily, although most scholars today reject this in part because all other New Testament passages with the translation "daily" include the word  ('day').

The difficulty in understanding  goes at least as far back as AD 382. Jerome accomplished this by going back to the original Greek of the New Testament and translating it into Latin; his translation came to be known as the Vulgate. In the identical contexts of Matthew and Luke—that is, reporting the Lord's Prayer—Jerome translated  in two different ways: by morphological analysis as 'supersubstantial' in Matthew 6:11, but retaining 'daily' in Luke 11:3.

The Catechism of the Catholic Church holds that there are several ways of understanding  (which the Catechism calls ), including the traditional 'daily', but most literally as 'supersubstantial' or 'superessential', based on its morphological components.

Appearances and uniqueness

The word is visible in the Hanna Papyrus 1 (𝔓75), the oldest surviving witness for certain New Testament passages.

 is the only adjective in the Lord's Prayer. It is masculine, accusative, singular, agreeing in gender, number, and case with the noun it qualifies,  ("bread"). In an interlinear gloss:

In the 20th century, another supposed instance appeared to come to light. This seemed to indicate that it was used in the sense of "enough for today", "enough for tomorrow", or "necessary". However, after the papyrus containing the shopping list, missing for many years, was rediscovered at the Yale Beinecke Library in 1998, a re-examination found the word  (oil), not  (the original transcriber, A. H. Sayce, was apparently known to be a poor transcriber). In addition, the document was reassessed to date from the first or second century AD, not the 5th century. Therefore, the use of  seems indeed to occur nowhere else in ancient Greek literature besides Matthew, Luke, and Didache.

, used in Acts 7:26 and elsewhere to refer to the  day, may be a cognate word.

Translations and interpretations
There are several reasons that  presents an exceptional translation challenge. The word appears nowhere else in other Ancient Greek texts, and so may have been coined by the authors of the Gospel. Jesus probably did not originally compose the prayer in Greek, but in his native language (either Aramaic language or Hebrew), but the consensus view is that the New Testament was originally written in Koine Greek. This implies the probability of language interpretation (i.e., spoken Aramaic to written Greek) at the outset of recording the Gospel. Thus, the meaning of any such word is often difficult to determine, because cross-references and comparisons with other usages are not possible, except by morphological analysis.

The most popular morphological analysis sees prefix  and a polysemantic word  even though that does not follow the standard Greek form of building compound words. Usually the iota at the end of  would be dropped in a compound whose second word starts with a vowel (compare, e. g., eponym vs epigraph). This is not an absolute rule, however: Jean Carmignac has collected 26 compound words that violate it. Alternatively, the word may be analyzed as a feminine participle from two different verbs.

Even Jerome, the most important translator of the Bible to Latin, translated this same word in the same context in two different ways. Today there is no consensus on the exact meaning. What follows is a review of the alternative translations:

Daily
It is the term used in the Tyndale Bible, the King James Version, and in the most popular modern English versions.

This  interpretation is first recorded in the works of Tertullian.

The Vulgate is a late fourth-century Latin translation of the Bible from its original languages, and was largely the work of St. Jerome. Jerome was commissioned by Pope Damasus I in the year 382 to revise the  version of the Gospels. The  translation remains in the Latin text of the Roman Catholic Mass, even though the same liturgy mainly references the Gospel of Matthew, which uses  for translating .

Some translators have proposed slight variations on daily as the most accurate. Richard Francis Weymouth, an English schoolmaster, translated it as "bread for today" in the Weymouth New Testament. Edgar J. Goodspeed in An American Translation used "bread for the day." Another option is to view  as an allusion to Exodus 16:4 where God promises to provide a day's portion of manna every day. This verse could be an attempt to translate the Hebrew of "bread sufficient to the day" into Greek.

The word  is found in Acts 7:26, 16:11, 20:15, 21:18 and 23:11. This word is typically taken to mean "next" in the context of "the next day or night".

Moreover, all other instances of "daily" in the English New Testament translate  ("day"), which does not appear in this usage. The daily translation also makes the term redundant, with "this day" already making clear the bread is for the current day.

Supersubstantial
In the Vulgate Jerome translated  in Matthew 6:11 as supersubstantial, coining a new word not before seen in Latin. The Catholic Church believes that this, or superessential, is the most literal English translation via Latin, which lacks a grammatical form for being, the literal translation of the Greek , and so substance or essence are used instead.

Advocates
This interpretation was supported by early writers such as Augustine, Cyril of Jerusalem, Cyprian of Carthage and John Cassian.

This translation is used by some modern Bibles. In the Douay-Rheims Bible English translation of the Vulgate (Matthew 6:11) reads "give us this day our supersubstantial bread". The translation of supersubstantial bread has also been associated with the Eucharist, as early as in the time of the Church Fathers and later also by the Council of Trent (1551).

It is not an edition of the historical Vulgate, but a revision of the text intended to accord with modern critical Hebrew and Greek texts and produce a style closer to classical Latin.

"Daily" occurs nowhere else in the New Testament. Taken in a temporal sense, this word is a pedagogical repetition of "this day," to confirm us in trust "without reservation." Taken in the qualitative sense, it signifies what is necessary for life, and more broadly every good thing sufficient for subsistence. Taken literally (: "super-essential"), it refers directly to the Bread of Life, the Body of Christ, the "medicine of immortality," without which we have no life within us. Finally in this connection, its heavenly meaning is evident: "this day" is the Day of the Lord, the day of the feast of the kingdom, anticipated in the Eucharist that is already the foretaste of the kingdom to come. For this reason it is fitting for the Eucharistic liturgy to be celebrated each day.

In the Eastern Orthodox Church, "supersubstantial" is thought to be a more accurate translation.  Here is how Father Thomas Hopko of Saint Vladimir's Seminary in New York explains it:

 [...] [is] an absolutely unique word. Etymologically [...],  means "on top of" and  means "substance" or "being". So it means suprasubstantial bread. Suprasubstantial bread: more-than-necessary bread. In the first Latin translation of the Lord's Prayer, done by Jerome it was [...], . Somewhere along the way it became ", daily". Luther translated "daily" from the beginning: .

But in all languages that traditionally Eastern Christians use—Greek, Slavonic, and all the Arabic languages: Aramaic, Arabic—it doesn't say that; it just says a word that's similar to that [...] How do they translate it [into those languages]? [...] they claim that the best translation would be: "Give us today the bread of tomorrow". Give us today the bread of the coming age, the bread that when you eat it, you can never die. What is the food of the coming age? It's God himself, God's word, God's Son, God's lamb, God's bread, which we already have here on earth, on earth, before the second coming. So what we're really saying is, "Feed us today with the bread of the coming age", because we are taught by Jesus not to seek the bread that perishes, but the bread that, you eat it, you can never die.

Eucharist metaphor
This translation has often been connected to the eucharist. The bread necessary for existence is the communion bread of the Last Supper. That the gospel writers needed to create a new word indicates to Eugene LaVerdiere, an American Catholic priest and biblical scholar of the post-Vatican II era, that they are describing something new. Eating the communion bread at the Last Supper created the need for a new word for this new concept.

It was the basis for the argument advanced by theologians such as Cyprian that communion must be eaten daily. That only bread is mentioned led to the practice of giving the laity only the bread and not the wine of the Eucharist. This verse was cited in arguments against the Utraquists. The translation was reconsidered with the Protestant Reformation. Martin Luther originally kept supersubstantial but switched to daily by 1528.

Criticisms
Those rejecting this translation include some Roman Catholic Biblical scholars, such as Raymond E. Brown, Jean Carmignac, and Nicholas Ayo.

There is no known source word from Aramaic or Hebrew, the native languages of Jesus, that translates into the Greek word . In fact, there is no word in either of these languages that easily translates as supersubstantial, a unique translation for a unique Greek word.

M. Eugene Boring, a Protestant theologian at Texas Christian University, claims that the connection with the Eucharist is ahistoric because he thinks that the ritual only developed some time after the Gospel was written and that the author of Matthew does not seem to have any knowledge of or interest in the Eucharist. Craig Blomberg, also a Protestant New Testament scholar, agrees that these "concepts had yet to be introduced when Jesus gave his original prayer and therefore could not have been part of his original meaning."

Necessary for existence
Another interpretation is to link  to the Greek word  meaning both the verb to be and the noun substance. Origen was the first writer to comment on the unusual word. A native Greek speaker writing a century and half after the Gospels were composed, he did not recognize the word and thought it was an original neologism.

George Ricker Berry translated the word as simply "necessary" in 1897.  Philosopher Raïssa Maritain, wife of philosopher Jacques Maritain, writes that during her era of the 1940s this translation was found to be the most acceptable by modern scholars. Her own conclusion was stated as being in agreement with Theodore of Mopsuestia, that being the "bread we need." This was seen as vague enough to cover what was viewed as the three possible etymological meanings:  (1) literal – the "bread of tomorrow or the bread of the present day," (2) analogical – the "bread we need in order to subsist," and (3) spiritual/mystical – the bread "which is above our substance" (i.e., supersubstantial).

Joseph Fitzmyer translates the verse as "give us this day our bread for subsistence." He connects this to the Aramaic targum translations of Proverbs 30:8.

Like daily, this translation also has the problem that there are well known Greek words that could have been used instead.

For the future
The "for the future" translation is today held by the majority of scholars. Early supporters of this translation include Cyril of Alexandria and Peter of Laodicea by way of linking  with the verb , "of tomorrow." According to Jewish theologian Herbert Basser, this translation was also considered (but eventually rejected) as a possibility by Jerome, who noted it as an aside in his commentary to Matthew that the Gospel of the Hebrews used  ("for tomorrow") in this verse.

Raymond E. Brown claims it is also indicated by early Bohairic and Sahidic sources. Referencing  in Acts 7:26, the Lutheran theologian Albert Schweitzer, reintroduced this translation in modern times. A "for the future" reading leads to a cluster of related translations, including: "bread for tomorrow," "bread for the future," and "bread for the coming day."

Beyond the literal meaning, this translation can also be read in an eschatological context: "the petition for an anticipation of the world to come." Others see tomorrow being referenced to the end times and the bread that of the messianic feast. Raymond Brown argues that all the other phrases of the Lord's Prayer are eschatological, so it would be incongruous for this phrase to be speaking prosaically about bread for eating. Eduard Schweizer, a Swiss New Testament scholar and theologian, disagrees. Humble bread was not traditionally presented as part of the messianic feast and the prosaic need for bread to survive would have been a universal sentiment of Jesus' followers.

The Catholic theologian Brant Pitre acknowledges the "for the future'" interpretation is held by a majority of scholars, but criticizes it for lacking support among ancient Christian interpreters.  Pitre also cites that an adjectival form for "tomorrow" exists in ancient Greek,  in Matthew 6:34, and could have been used instead of the one-time-use .

Another potential issue with a "for the future" translation is it seems to contradict Matthew 6:31, where only a few verses later Jesus tells his followers not to worry about food, that God will take care of such needs. W.D. Davies, a Welsh Congregationalist scholar, and Dale Allison, an American New Testament scholar, however, do not see a contradiction. Matthew 6:34 tells one not to be anxious about such needs. That a pious person asks God in prayer for these needs to be filled, may rather be why there is no need to worry.

Doesn't run out
Kenneth E. Bailey, a professor of theology and linguistics, proposed "give us today the bread that doesn't run out" as the correct translation. The Syriac versions of the Bible were some of the first translations of the Gospels from the Greek into another language. Syriac is also close to Jesus' own Aramaic, and the translators close in time and language to Jesus should thus have had considerable insight into his original meanings.

Estate
Lutheran scholar Douglas E. Oakman suggests "give us today bread in abundance" as another translation. He notes that in the contemporary literature  can mean substance, but it also has a concrete meaning of a large, substantial, estate. Thus as a cognate of the word ,  could refer to plentiful or abundant bread.

Oakman also notes contemporary sources that translate  as the royal or imperial estate and proposes that the verse could originally have meant "give us the royal bread ration for today."

That belongs to it
Davies and Allison state that the verse has also been translated as "give us this day the bread that belongs to it," though they concede that this expression is little recognized by modern scholars.

By language family

Slavonic translations
The Old Church Slavonic canon translates epiousion variously as well. Sava's book agrees in the latter case, but has  ('daily') in the former, while Codex Zographensis has  and  respectively.

The New Church Slavonic version has the calque  in both cases now, following 16th-century Ostrog Bible, and the dictionaries translate the New Church Slavonic word as 'necessary for existence' (note that the sense of the word likely changed in course of the time), from which derives Russian .

Equivalent terms used in other languages

See also
 Language of the New Testament
 Filioque

Notes

References

 M. Nijman and K. A. Worp. "ΕΠΙΟΥΣΙΟΣ in a documentary papyrus?". Novum Testamentum XLI (1999) 3 (July), p. 231-234.
 B.M. Metzger, "How Many Times Does ΕΠΙΟΥΣΙΟΣ Occur outside The Lord's Prayer?" ExpTimes 69 (1957–58) 52–54.

New Testament Greek words and phrases
Lord's Prayer
Sayings of Jesus
Words and phrases with no direct English translation